Gabard Fénélon (born 3 June 1981) is a Haitian footballer who plays as a goalkeeper for Canadian club CS Mont-Royal Outremont.

Early years
Fénelon was born in Tortuga (Île de la Tortue), a small Haitian island in the northwest of the country. At the age of fourteen, his football talents led him to Port-de-Paix, a major city adjacent to Tortuga, inland of Haiti across the coast to develop his skills. Having been significantly better than his peers his own age, he was played against players who were older. Arriving as a striker, his position was changed to goalkeeper at age sixteen at the regional level.

Club career
Fénelon played for Haitian League sides Racing Gonaïves and Racing Club Haïtien before moving to Miami FC at the start of the 2007 season. He returned to Haiti in 2008, Racing Club Haïtien. In 2011, Fenelon played with Panellinios in the Ligue de Soccer Elite Quebec and joined FC Saint-Léonard of the new Première Ligue de soccer du Québec in 2012 with notably ex-Serie A player Sandro Grande.

International career
Fénélon made his debut for Haiti in a March 2003 Gold Cup qualifying match against Jamaica. He won the Caribbean Cup of Nations with Haiti in 2007. He was a squad member at the 2007 Gold Cup Finals Fénélon played for the Canada national futsal team at QCSL World Cup 2010.

Honours
 Caribbean Nations Cup (1) : 2007
 PLSQ League Cup (1) : 2015

External links

 
Gabard Fénélon profile at Footballdatabase.eu

References

1981 births
Living people
Futsal goalkeepers
Association football goalkeepers
Haitian footballers
People from Nord-Ouest (department)
Miami FC (2006) players
Ligue Haïtienne players
USL First Division players
Première ligue de soccer du Québec players
Haiti international footballers
2007 CONCACAF Gold Cup players
FC St-Léonard players
ACP Montréal-Nord players
FC Lanaudière players
Lakeshore SC players
CS Mont-Royal Outremont players